Samuel Prophask Asamoah (born 14 February 1981) is a Ghanaian painter  His works have been exhibited widely, locally and internationally with several in art collections. He sits comfortably in the field of painting with his inspirations for his themes from proverbs, daily activities and dreams. His motivation is finding joy while painting and experiencing pain when not painting. His brush name is Prophask and he takes the world as ‘The land of colours'.

Biography 
Samuel Prophask Asamoah was born on 14 February 1981 at Apenimadi near Hwediem in the Brong Ahafo  Region of Ghana. He is from the Bretuo family and belongs to the Bosompra clan. His father, Akwasi Appiah, though a farmer, was an experienced craftsman. Asamoah started his primary education at the Asuoyeboa M/A Primary and Junior High School where his talent was identified through his pencil and colour works. In 1999, he started his senior high school education at the Kumasi Secondary Technical School where he studied Visual Arts. He started sending his works to the Kwame Nkrumah University of Science and Technology (KNUST) gallery and started partaking in the institution's exhibitions. In the tenth anniversary celebration in the school,  Asamoah was awarded the best student in General Knowledge in Art due to his demonstration of versatility in creating artworks with a diverse medium. In 2003, he went to the Kwame Nkrumah University of Science and Technology to study Integrated Rural Art and Industry. At K.N.U.S.T., he participated in the Tratech exhibitions in 2004 and 2005 as well as in the peace pledge exhibition in 2006.

His works are collected in the Ministry of Culture, Tourism and Creative Art, Regimanuel Hotel Gray Estate Limited, Ghana, Stanbic Bank, Ghana, Vodafone Ghana, Nestle Ghana Limited and many other private and public collections. He is now a full-time painter and the chief executive officer of Prophask Ghana Limited.

Style 
Asamoah works in diverse styles: He creates abstract, semi-abstract, realistic, and surrealistic paintings. In addition, he employs cubism, expressionism, impressionism, and fauvism styles in unique combinations to speak his language of art, which he describes as synonymous to music. His preferred substrate for painting is canvas with his popular medium being acrylic paint. He utilizes colour to the fullest in his paintings. He interplays warm and cool colours to enliven his ideas in painting. The theme for his paintings focuses on Ghanaian rural and contemporary life, Ghanaian culture, philosophical epistemologies in African proverbs, religious themes, dreams, politics, gender issues, as well as women empowerment and development. His favorite figure is the feminine shape, which he claims depicts the gracefulness and perfection in nature.

Selected exhibitions 

 New Directions, Ankara, Turkey, 2015 
 New Trend, Berlin, Germany, 2015 
 Legacy, Lisbon, Portugal, 2015 
 Art for Every Home, Malabo, Equatorial Guinea, 2015 
 Prerequisite, Centre for National Culture, Accra, Ghana, 2015 
 Redefinition, Freetown, Sierra Leone, 2013 
 Speaking Colour, Dubai, 2013 
 Colours that speak, South Africa, 2013 
 Ghana to Korea, Moree Gallery, Yeosu, South Korea, 2012
 Life, Lagos, Nigeria, 2012
 True Colour, Lome, Togo, 2012 
 Life, Cotonou, Benin, 2012 
 Independence, Alliance Francoise, Kumasi, Ghana 2007
 Gold Coast Artist, View from the Top, United Kingdom, 2006

References 

1981 births
Ghanaian artists
Living people